State Highway 70 (SH 70) is a state highway in Texas.

Route description
SH 70 begins in far northeastern Coke County at a junction with  US 277 north of Bronte. The highway soon crosses into Nolan County, where it serves as the northern terminus of  SH 153. The first large city along SH 70's route is Sweetwater; here, the route is concurrent with Interstate 20 and  US 84 along the south side of the city, between I-20's Exits #244 and #247, before it resumes its northward course and enters Fisher County. SH 70 intersects  US 180 in Roby and  SH 92 in Rotan. Continuing north into Kent County, the route begins a concurrency with  US 380 that lasts until Jayton. In Dickens County, SH 70 serves as the northern terminus of  SH 208 and passes through the east and north side of Spur before reaching Dickens and an intersection with  US 82 / SH 114. After heading almost due north from here, the route enters Motley County and passes through the town of Roaring Springs. The next major city along the route is Matador, where SH 70 and  US 70 intersect one another (along with  US 62). After leaving Matador, SH 70 enters Hall County, where it has a brief concurrency with  SH 86 through Turkey. The highway then briefly turns to the northwest and enters Briscoe County, beginning a brief concurrency with  SH 256, before turning to the west and reentering Hall County; the two routes separate near the community of South Brice. SH 70 resumes a more northerly path into Donley County, and has a short concurrency with  US 287 through Clarendon. After the two routes separate, SH 70 heads due north to a junction with Interstate 40 at its Exit #124, near the Donley–Gray County line. Northbound SH 70 is concurrent with the freeway for about  before the routes split at I-40 Exit #121. SH 70 continues north into Pampa, where it intersects  US 60 and has a half-mile duplex with  SH 152. After leaving Pampa, the route turns more to the north-northeast, and enters the sparsely-populated Roberts County, where its only intersections are with a few farm to market roads that connect to the county seat of Miami. SH 70 then enters Ochiltree County and reaches its northern terminus at  US 83 south of Perryton. While the current official route description of SH 70 indicates a concurrency with US 83 to a junction with  SH 15 in Perryton, that roadway is presently signed only as US 83, which agrees with TxDOT's County Map Book, and signage in Perryton at the SH 15 junction with US 83 directs traffic to SH 70 using "TO SH 70" markers.

History
SH 70 was originally designated on August 21, 1923, from Aspermont to San Angelo along a portion of the original SH 4, which had been shifted farther east. On October 13, 1925, it was routed through Robert Lee. On September 18, 1929, SH 70 was rerouted to bypass Robert Lee. Part became SH 70A, but Robert Lee to San Angelo was cancelled, but restored as SH 208 on July 16, 1934. On December 1, 1930, the route had been rerouted north to Jayton, replacing SH 161 and a small portion of SH 84. On September 26, 1939, SH 70 was extended north from Jayton to Dickens, absorbing a portion of  SH 18. Significant extension came on October 10, 1947, when SH 70 was extended to Perryton in the northern Panhandle; this was due to the realignment of US 62 between Matador and Ralls, bypassing Dickens, and the cancellation of SH 18 from Matador to Perryton. On February 12, 1948, US 277 was rerouted to a more westerly alignment between Abilene, Texas and San Angelo, Texas, and the section from just south of Blackwell to near San Angelo was transferred to that route. On September 27, 1957, SH 70 was shifted to a more westerly alignment in Dickens, and Loop 120 was extended along the old route of SH 70 through the city.

A spur, SH 70A, was designated on September 18, 1929, from Robert Lee east to Bronte. This route was renumbered as SH 158 on March 19, 1930.

On September 27, 1985, Texas State Highway Loop 549 was designated as a bypass of SH 70 in Sweetwater and was signed, but not designated, as SH 70, and the old route was signed as a business route. On June 21, 1990, SH 70 was designated on Loop 549, and the old route of SH 70 became a business route, cancelling Loop 549.

Business route

SH 70 has one business route, Business SH 70-G in Sweetwater, which is a former alignment of the state highway through that city. The route was designated in 1990, when SH 70 was rerouted along the south and east side of the city to use the  I-20 freeway. The business route is also concurrent with  BL I-20 through downtown Sweetwater.

Junction list

Major intersections

Notes

References

070
Transportation in Ochiltree County, Texas
Transportation in Roberts County, Texas
Transportation in Gray County, Texas
Transportation in Donley County, Texas
Transportation in Hall County, Texas
Transportation in Briscoe County, Texas
Transportation in Motley County, Texas
Transportation in Dickens County, Texas
Transportation in Kent County, Texas
Transportation in Fisher County, Texas
Transportation in Nolan County, Texas
Transportation in Coke County, Texas